All Things Vice is a blog that was started in 2012 by Australian author and journalist Eileen Ormsby about news in the dark web. Since her investigations into the Silk Road in 2013, the darknet market led her to blog about various happenings in the dark web and publish two books, Silk Road (2014) and The Darkest Web (2018).

Ormsby is a former Australian lawyer living in Melbourne. Sought for comment, Ormsby has written, been interviewed and cited on dark web, 419 scams, bitcoin and darknet market issues. She has obtained a number of exclusive interviews from individuals involved in the dark web. She was cited in the trial of drug dealer Paul Leslie Howard that he discovered the Silk Road market after reading the coverage on her site. She also regularly writes scripts for Casefile True Crime Podcast, including some about the dark web.

References

External links 

 

Dark web
Darknet markets
Australian news websites